The Julia Ideson Building is a Houston Public Library facility in Downtown Houston, Texas, United States. It is named for Julia Bedford Ideson, who served as the system's first head librarian for 40 years.

The Spanish Renaissance-style building is part of the Central Library, and houses its archives, manuscripts, and Texas and Local History departments. It is also the site of the Houston Metropolitan Research Center.

From 1926 to 1976 it was Houston's sole main library building.

History
Designed by Ralph Adams Cram of Cram and Ferguson, Boston, the Ideson Building opened in 1926 as HPL's Central Library. Designed in a Spanish Revival style, it replaced the prior Carnegie building. In 1976 the Jesse H. Jones Building (as it was named in 1989) opened, and the main portion of the Central Library moved to it.

The building was listed in the National Register of Historic Places in 1977.  The Ideson building reopened in 1979.

Lana Berkowitz of the Houston Chronicle described a local legend that the Ideson Building was haunted by the ghosts of library caretaker Jacob Frank Cramer and his dog Petey.

References

External links

 About the Julia Ideson Building - Houston Public Library
  - Downtown Houston organization
 The Ghost of Jacob, the real story of Jacob Cramer who haunts the Julia Ideson Library.

Houston Public Library
Library buildings completed in 1926
Libraries in Houston
National Register of Historic Places in Houston
Buildings and structures in Houston
Ralph Adams Cram buildings
Libraries on the National Register of Historic Places in Texas
Spanish Revival architecture in the United States
1926 establishments in Texas
Recorded Texas Historic Landmarks
Texas State Antiquities Landmarks
Downtown Houston